The WAGR Ec class was a class of 4-6-2 heavy passenger and goods Vauclain compound locomotives operated by the Western Australian Government Railways (WAGR) between 1901 and 1958.

History
A total of 20 Ec class engines were built by Baldwin Locomotive Works, Philadelphia, in the first half of 1901, and entered service with the WAGR later that year. The following year, Baldwin built the first of two batches of the C class, a lighter version of the Ec class.

Initially, the Ec class' main task was to haul heavy trains on the Eastern Goldfields Railway. Between 1920 and 1923, nine Ec class engines were lightened for use on the lightly laid Northam to Mullewa line, and reclassified as the Eca class.

All 20 were withdrawn between 1923 and 1925, with the frames, wheels, cabs and tenders married with new boilers, cylinders and valve gear at Midland Railway Workshops to become the L class. The costs of the rebuilds were recovered within four years through lower maintenance costs.

By the early 1930s, frame cracks were beginning to appear with 14 receiving new frames. They were replaced in the 1950s by the W class.

See also

Rail transport in Western Australia
List of Western Australian locomotive classes

References

Notes

Cited works

External links

Baldwin locomotives
Railway locomotives introduced in 1901
Ec WAGR class
Vauclain compound locomotives
3 ft 6 in gauge locomotives of Australia
4-6-2 locomotives
Passenger locomotives